HBO Go is a partly-inactive authenticated video on demand of the pay television service HBO. The service allowed subscribers to HBO via television providers to access its programming on-demand via the HBO website, mobile apps, and digital media players among other devices.

The service began to be phased out in the United States in 2020 following the launch of HBO Max, a new subscription streaming service featuring content from both HBO and parent company WarnerMedia. HBO Max would be made available at no additional charge to HBO subscribers on participating providers, but would also be available on a direct-to-consumer basis.

The "HBO Go" brand is also used in international markets for TV Everywhere and over-the-top services offering HBO programming. For example, HBO Canada previously operated an HBO Go service, but this was discontinued in 2018 when its parent service The Movie Network rebranded as Crave and merged with a previously-separate streaming service that held rights to HBO library programming.

Overview
HBO Go was the successor to HBO on Broadband, which was originally launched in January 2008 to Time Warner Cable customers in the Green Bay and Milwaukee, Wisconsin, areas. Programming content available on the service consisted of 400 hours of feature and HBO original television films (including 130 movie titles that rotated monthly), specials and original series that could be downloaded to computers, at no extra charge for HBO subscribers; in order to access HBO on Broadband content, users had to be a digital cable customer that had a subscription to HBO, and used Time Warner Cable's Roadrunner cable modem service.

The service launched nationally as HBO Go on February 18, 2010, initially available through Verizon FiOS. Over the following years, the service expanded to other providers including AT&T U-verse, Comcast, Cox Communications, Time Warner Cable, DirecTV, Dish Network, Suddenlink Communications, and Charter Communications in some states, as well as through vMVPD services AT&T TV Now, AT&T TV and Hulu. The service can be accessed through a web browser or through apps for select smart TV sets, Amazon Fire, iOS, Android, Chromecast, Roku, PlayStation 4 and Xbox One.

At launch, the service was accessible only on personal computers via the HBO website. Applications for iOS and Android devices were released on April 29, 2011, making the service available on smartphones and tablet computers. The app had over one million downloads in its first week, and was downloaded over three million times by the end of June 2011.

In October 2011, Roku streaming players became the first television-connected devices to support the service, and availability was later rolled out to the Apple TV, Chromecast, PlayStation consoles, Samsung Smart TVs, and Xbox consoles. Availability on set-top boxes and gaming consoles is determined by individual cable providers in the United States with some omissions. Currently Comcast does not support the PlayStation 3, PlayStation 4, Fire TV and did not support Roku players until late 2014. Sling TV subscribers who receive HBO through that service are unable to access HBO Go, since HBO's live feed and on-demand content is available through the Sling TV apps. The same also applies to PlayStation Vue subscribers except they also have access to HBO Now.

In January 2019, HBO Go was dropped from PlayStation 3, Xbox 360, and Samsung Smart TVs released before 2013.

Content
HBO Go streamed a selection of theatrically released films (via film studios that maintain distribution deals with HBO including 20th Century Fox, Universal Pictures and network sister company Warner Bros. Pictures) with a significant number of titles added and removed from the service every month. HBO original series are available on a permanent basis. New episodes of current series are typically available for streaming beginning at the time of their initial broadcast in the Eastern Time Zone on the linear HBO channel.

However, HBO Go did not carry several past HBO series, such as Tales from the Crypt, Tenacious D, 1st & Ten, Da Ali G Show, or The Ricky Gervais Show. The Larry Sanders Show and Arliss were initially unavailable but added in 2016 and 2018 respectively. Moreover, unlike TV Everywhere services offered by most other broadcast and cable-satellite television networks, HBO Go does not provide access to near-real-time streams of HBO's linear channels.

Discontinuation 
In the U.S., HBO Go was deprecated following the launch of WarnerMedia's HBO Max service in May 2020; the company had reached agreements with individual providers to give HBO subscribers access to HBO Max at no additional charge. HBO Max was not supported for several months on certain devices supported by HBO Go, including Amazon Fire and Fire TV (arrived on that platform on November 17, 2020). and Roku (December 17, 2020). 

On June 12, 2020, it was announced that because "the large majority of HBO Go usage occurs on platforms with whom we have HBO Max deals currently in place", HBO Go would be discontinued on July 31, 2020. HBO Now, a separate, direct-to-consumer version of the HBO service, was also folded into HBO Max on-launch for most subscribers.

HBO Go will continue operating in eight markets in Asia as an interim service before the streaming service which encompass all WBD properties (which would feature all of the content of HBO Max and most, but not all, of the content of Discovery+) launching in mid-2024.

Platforms
 Amazon Fire TV (December 16, 2014)
 Android (April 29, 2011)
 Android TV (October 29, 2015)
 iOS (April 29, 2011)
 Apple TV (June 19, 2013)
 Google Chromecast (November 22, 2013)
 LG webOS (March 20, 2019)
 Mola (September 5, 2020)
 PlayStation 4 (March 3, 2015)
 Roku streaming players (October 11, 2011)
 Samsung Smart TVs, manufactured 2013 or later (February 17, 2012)
 TiVo (February 16, 2016)
 Xbox One (November 20, 2014)

References

External links
 (redirect to HBO Max)]
Asian version of HBO GO website

Go
HBO Go
Internet television channels
Computer-related introductions in 2010
Audiovisual introductions in 2010
Subscription video on demand services